Francis Thompson (1859–1907) was an English poet and ascetic.

Francis Thompson may also refer to:

 Francis Thompson (architect) (1808–1895), architect known for his railway work
 Francis Longstreth Thompson (1890–1973), British town planner
 Francis Roy Thompson (1896–1966), Australian artist whose work was first exhibited at the New Gallery of Fine Art in Adelaide (aka Frank Roy or F. R. Thompson)
 Francis Thompson (film director) (1908–2003), American film director
 Francis Thompson (historian)  (1925–2017), English economic and social historian
 Francis Thompson (bishop) (fl. 1964–1996), Anglican bishop in Africa

See also
Frances Thompson (disambiguation)
Frank Thompson (disambiguation)
Francis Thomson (disambiguation)